The Door is a studio album by Delta blues artist Keb' Mo', released in 2000.

The album peaked at No. 122 on the Billboard 200. It was nominated for a Grammy, for "Best Contemporary Blues Album".

Production
Co-produced by Russ Titelman, the album employed many well-known session musicians.

Critical reception
The Washington Post wrote that "even when he updates the Elmore James classic 'It Hurts Me Too' with an arrangement that weds a funk beat to a wash of electronics, Mo' makes the transition from analog to digital age seem smooth, if not exactly welcome." The Chicago Tribune thought that the "acoustic, adult-contemporary blues style becomes more sophisticated with every album." OC Weekly deemed the album "a disappointment," calling it "more James Taylor than Skip James." The Record wrote that "this Los Angeles musician's urban folk-blues stew remains disarmingly soothing."

Track listing
All songs written by Kevin Moore (Keb' Mo') unless otherwise noted.
 "The Door" (Moore, Leon Ware)
 "Loola Loo" (Moore, Bobby McFerrin) 
 "It Hurts Me Too" (Mel London) 
 "Come on Back"  
 "Stand Up (And Be Strong)" (Moore, Clayton Gibb)
 "Anyway"  
 "Don't You Know"  
 "It's All Coming Back" (Moore, John Lewis Parker) 
 "Gimme What You Got" (Moore, Kevin McCormick) 
 "Mommy Can I Come Home" (Moore, Melissa Manchester)
 "Change"  
 "The Beginning" (Moore, Bobby McFerrin)

Personnel 
 Keb' Mo' - guitars, banjo, harmonica, vocals
 Jim Keltner, Steve Jordan - drums
 Sergio Gonzalez - percussion, drums
 Reggie McBride - bass
 Scarlet Rivera - violin
 Greg Leisz - pedal steel guitar
 Greg Phillinganes - synthesizer, pedal steel guitar, keyboards
 David Mann, Lawrence Feldman - saxophones
 Thomas Tally - viola
 Gerri Sutyak - cello
 Leon Ware, Dennis Collins, Marva Hicks - backing vocals

References

2000 albums
Keb' Mo' albums
Albums produced by Russ Titelman
Epic Records albums